Shen Dehong (Shen Yanbing; 4 July 1896 – 27 March 1981), known by the pen name of Mao Dun, was a Chinese essayist, journalist, novelist, and playwright. Mao Dun, as a 20th-century Chinese novelist, literary and cultural critic, and Minister of Culture (1949–65), was one of the most celebrated left-wing realist novelists of modern China. His most famous work is Midnight (子夜), a novel depicting life in cosmopolitan Shanghai. It is also considered to be the work with the greatest influence on his future writing. Furthermore, during the period in which he was writing Midnight, Mao Dun formed a strong friendship with another of China's most famous writers, Lu Xun.

Mao Dun also worked in genres other than novels, such as essays, script-writing, theories, short stories, and novellas. He was well known for translating western literature, as he had gained academic knowledge of European literature from his studies at Peking University in 1913. Additionally, although he was not the first person in China to translate the works of Scottish historical novelist Walter Scott, he is considered to be the first person to popularize Walter Scott's work in China through his "Critical Biography".

He adopted the pen name "Mao Dun" to express the tension in the conflicting revolutionary ideology within China in the 1920s. The name means "contradiction", as Mao means spears and Dun means shields.

Early life
His father, Shen Yongxi taught and designed the curriculum for his son, but he died when Mao Dun was ten. Mao Dun's mother Chen Aizhu then became his teacher. He mentions in his memoirs that "my first instructor is my mother". Through learning from his parents, Mao Dun developed great interest in writing as well as reading during his childhood.

Mao Dun had already started to develop his writing skills when he was still in primary school. In one examination the examiner commented on Mao Dun's script: '12 year old young child, can make this language, not says motherland nobody'. There were other similar comments which indicate that Mao Dun had been a brilliant writer since his youth.

While Mao Dun was studying in secondary school in Hangzhou, extensive reading and strict writing skills training filled his life. He read the Wen Xuan, Shishuo Xinyu, and a large number of classical novels, which influenced his writing style.

Mao Dun entered the three-year foundation school offered by Peking University in 1913, in which he studied Chinese and Western literature. Due to financial difficulties, he had to quit in the summer of 1916, before his graduation. After quitting from university, he immediately got married with the daughter of Kong family (孔家), Kong Dezhi (孔德沚).

The trainings in Chinese and English as well as knowledge of Chinese and Western literature provided by the fifteen years of education Mao Dun received had prepared him to show up in the limelight of the Chinese journalistic and literary arena.

Journalistic career
After graduation, Mao Dun soon got his first job in the English editing and translation sections of the Commercial Press, Shanghai branch. At the age of 21, he was invited to be the assistant editor of Xuesheng Zazhi (Students' Magazine) under the Commercial Press, which had published many articles about the new ideologies that had emerged in China at that time.

Apart from editing, Mao Dun also started to write about his social thoughts and criticisms. To some extent, he was inspired by the famous magazine New Youth (新青年). Like in 1917 and 1918, he wrote two editorials for Xuesheng Zazhi: Students and Society (學生與社會) and The Students of 1918, those were significant in stimulating political consciousness among the young educated Chinese.

At 24 years of age, Mao Dun was already renowned as a novelist by the community in general, and in 1920, he and a group of young writers took over the magazine Xiaoshuo Yuebao, which translated means "fiction monthly", to publish literature by western authors, such as Tolstoy, Chekhov, Balzac, Flaubert, Zola, Byron, Keats, Shaw, etc., and make new theories of literature better known. Despite the fact that he was a naturalistic novelist, he admired writers like Leo Tolstoy, for their great artistic style.

In 1920, he was invited to edit a new column: The Fiction-New-Wwaves in Fiction Monthly (小说月报). He even took up the post of Chief Editor of the Monthly in the same year and was obliged to reform it thoroughly, in response to the New Cultural Movement. His young writer friends in Beijing supported him by submitting their creative writings, translating Western literature and their views on new literature theories and techniques to the magazines. Literary Study Group was formed partly because of this. The reformed Monthly was proved to be a success. It had facilitated the continuation of the New Cultural Movement by selling ten thousand copies a month and more importantly by introducing Literature for life, a brand new realistic approach to Chinese literature. In this period, Mao Dun had become a leading figure of the movement in the southern part of China.

On the notion of content reformation, both the innovative and conservative parties in the Commercial Press could not make a compromise. Mao Dun resigned from the Chief Editor of Fiction Monthly in 1923, but in 1927 he became the chief columnist of the Minguo yuebao (民国月报). He wrote more than 30 editorials for this newspaper to criticize Chiang Kai-shek, and to support revolutions.

Political life
Inspired by the October Revolution of 1917 in Russia, Mao Dun took part in the May Fourth Movement in China. In 1920, he joined the Shanghai Communist Team, and helped to establish the Chinese Communist Party in 1921. At first, he worked as a liaison for the party. He also wrote for the party magazine The Communist Party.

At the same time, Mao Dun participated in Chiang Kai-shek's Northern Expedition (1926–28), the main purpose was to unite the country. He quit, however, when Chiang's Kuomintang broke with the Communists in 1927. In July 1928, he went to Japan in order to take refuge. As he returned to China in 1930, he joined the League of Left-Wing Writers. Later, China went to war with Japan and he actively engaged in resisting the Japanese attack in 1937. In 1949, the communist government took over and he was responsible for working as Mao Zedong's secretary and Culture Minister until 1965.

Literary career
As a literary man, Mao Dun had a great number of achievements. Fiction Monthly (小说月报) Reform was Mao Dun's first contribution to Chinese literature. The magazine then became a place where "New Literature" circulated. Many famous writers like Lu Xun, Xu Dishan, Bing Xin, Ye Shengtao, had their works published through it. Mao Dun supported movements such as "New Literature" and "New Thinking". He believed that Chinese literature should have a place in the world.

The experience of political conflict broadened his horizon in literature, therefore the theme of his later writing was mostly based on this. He then helped to found the League of Left-Wing Writers in 1930. After that, he worked together with Lu Xun to fight for the right of the society and the revolutionary movement in literature. The harvest period of Mao Dun's writing is considered to have been from 1927 to 1937.

Shi (蚀), was also called The Eclipse in English translation, which was the first actual novel written by Mao Dun and composed of three volumes, Disillusions (幻灭, 1927), Wavering (动摇, 1928), and Pursuits (追求, 1928). It is a story of a generation of young intellectuals, who are caught up in the world of revolutionary fervor without a true understanding of the nature of social change. His next major work was Rainbow (虹, 1929), which became famous for having no less than 70 main characters and numerous plot twists and turns. In 1933 came his next work, Midnight (子夜), which gained great popularity, to a point that it was also published in French and English, and it allowed to develop a sense of revolutionary realism. It is a naturalistic novel exploring the commercial world of Shanghai in detail. In addition, his fiction offered a sympathetic portrayal of working-class life and praise of revolution. He left a work unfinished, the trilogy Shuangye Hongsi Eryuehua (霜叶红似二月花, 1942).

Other than Mao Dun's works, he also participated in Chiang Kai-shek's Northern Expedition (1926–28) in an attempt to unify China, which was failed and he fled to Kuling, when the Kuomintang dissolved relations with the Chinese Communist Party. In the 1930s he was one of the key founders of the League of Left-Wing Writers, which was dissolved in a quarrel in 1936. After the initiation of the Sino-Japanese War in 1937, Mao traveled to many places and started a literary magazine in Wuhan. He edited the periodical Literary Front and the literary page of the newspaper Libao in Hong Kong and worked as a teacher. After 1943 Mao Dun did not produce any major works, but still wrote some articles and essays. In 1946 he visited the Soviet Union.

When the People's Republic of China was established by the Chinese Communist Party in 1949, he became active in several committees and he worked as the Secretary and then the Minister of Culture for Mao Zedong until 1965. He started the monthly literary journal Chinese Literature, which became the most popular for western readers. He was dismissed from his position as minister in 1964 due to the ideological upheavals. Despite this fact, Mao Dun survived the Cultural Revolution and was afterwards rehabilitated. In the 1970s he became an editor of a children's magazine, and began working on his memoirs, which were serialized in the Party publication, the quarterly Historical Materials on New literature, but he died on March 27, 1981, before he could finish it. His influence on Chinese literature continues to the present day because he used his savings to set up a fund called the Mao Dun Literature Scholarship to promote an atmosphere for writing fiction.

Mao Dun's achievements in literature were also seen at his 50th birthday, which was also the 25th anniversary of his literary life. More than five hundred guests came to celebrate with him. Russian and American friends also joined the celebration. Wong Roufei wrote an essay as congratulations on behalf of the Chinese Communist Party. Mao Dun's influence and achievements in the literary field were witnessed. On the other hand, he was twice elected as the chairman and then once elected as the vice-chairman of the China Literary Arts Representative Assembly. His status in the literary field has been highly recognized. Although he suffered great pain from illness in his old age, he still kept writing his memoirs, called The Road I Walked.

Besides his achievements, Mao Dun also had great influence on Chinese literature. The Mao Dun Literature Prize was created due to Mao Dun's wish that outstanding novels should be encouraged and communist literature should be promoted. It is one of the most honorable literature awards in China. Many famous modern Chinese literary authors like Wei Wei and Zhou Ke-qin have received the prize.

Marriage and personal life 
Mao Dun owned a typical traditional Chinese marriage. His family got him engaged to the Kong (孔) family when he was five years old and he married the daughter of Kong family after he quit from university. After their marriage, the daughter of Kong family had been renamed as Kong Dezhi (孔德沚)and she got chances to learn some new things that she had never been able to get to know before, which made her be able to assist Mao Dun with his literary and political career during their marriage.

However, the marriage between Mao Dun and Kong Dezhi was not perfect. Mao Dun had had a two-year long affair with Qin Dejun (秦德君) during his marriage with Kong Dezhi, which is also believed to have effects on his novel Rainbow (虹). In the end, Mao Dun ended this relationship and returned to his own family.

List of works

Mao Dun has over 100 publications throughout his life, which includes short stories, novels, theories etc. Some of his most famous works include:

Short stories
 Wild Rose ( Ye Qiangwei (1929)
 The Smoke and Cloud Collection  Yanyunji (1937)

Novellas
 Disillusions  Huanmie (1927)
 Wavering  Dongyao (1927)
 Pursuits  Zhuiqiu (1928)
 Three people walking,  Sanrenxing (1931)
 The Shop Of the Lin Family  Linjia Puzi  (1932)
 Spring Silkworms,  Chuncan (1932)
 Autumn Harvest  QiuShou

Novels
 Rainbow  Hong (1930)
 Midnight Ziye (1933)
 Giving to the poet festivalXian Gei Shi Ren Jie (1946)

Theories
 The recent works of Mao DunMao Dun Jin Zuo (1980)
 Mao Dun's comment on creativityMao Dun Lun Chuang Zuo (1980)

Essays
 "Travelling Diary of USSR"Su Lian Jian Wen Lu (1948)
 "Talks on USSR"Ji Tan Su Lian (1949)

Drama script
 Front and rear Pure Brightness, QianMingQianHou (1945)

Translation
 Modern drama Russian Question (1946)
 Novelette Group's Son (1946)

Others
 Works of Mao DunMao Dun Quanji  (vol. 1–15, 1984–1987)
 Introduction to the books of Mao DunMao Dun Shujian (1st edition, collection of letters, 1984) later changed the name into Mao Dun Shuxinji (1988)

Transition of female characters 
1930s is a turning point of the female characters' identity in Mao Dun's works. Between the 1920s and the 1930s, which was also the early period of Mao Dun's writing career, the female characters occurring in his works mostly were in identity of “New Woman". For instance, Mrs. Gui (桂阿姨) and Qionghua (琼华) in Wild Rose (野蔷薇, 1929), Ms. Mei (梅小姐) in Rainbow (虹, 1930)

However, from the 1930s, the “New Woman” characters in Mao Dun's works started to be replaced by the females who were living in traditional Chinese family. Furthermore, female characters even started to lose their own names. As in one of Mao Dun's short novels, which was released in the 1930s, Shui zaoxing (水藻行), the only female character did not even have an actual name but only be called as “Xiusheng (one of the two main male characters)'s wife (秀生妻)” in the novel.

References

Sources
 
 Bartleby.com article on Mao-Tun
 Encyclopedia.com article on Mao-Tun
 Yahoo Encyclopedia article on Mao-Tun
  Feng, Liping (April 1996). "Democracy and Elitism: The May Fourth Ideal of Literature". Modern China (Sage Publications, Inc.) 22 (2): 170–196. . .

Further reading
 Chen, Yu-shih. Realism and Allegory in the Early Fiction of Mao Dun. (1986)
 Gálik, Marián. Mao Tun and Modern Chinese Literary Criticism. (1969)
 Gálik, Marián. The Genesis of Modern Chinese Literature Criticism. (1980)
 Hsia, C.T. A History of Modern Chinese Fiction. (1961)
 Li Pin. Bianji jia Mao Dun pingzhuan Kaifeng: Henan University press (河南大學出版社), 1995. Available in HKU FPS library.
 Shao Bozhou, et al. ed. Mao Dun de wenxue daolu. (1959)
 Wang, David Der-wei. Fictional Realism in the Twentieth-Century China. (1992)
 Chinese Writers on Writing featuring Mao Dun. Ed. Arthur Sze. (Trinity University Press, 2010).
 Williams, Philip F. Village Echoes: The Fiction of Wu Zuxiang. (1993)

External links

 Mao Dun, Master Craftsman of Modern Chinese Literature by Fan Jun 
 The Sad End of Mao Dun
    Mao Dun. A Portrait by Kong Kai Ming at Portrait Gallery of Chinese Writers (Hong Kong Baptist University Library).

1896 births
1981 deaths
20th-century Chinese short story writers
20th-century Chinese dramatists and playwrights
20th-century essayists
Chinese communists
Commercial Press people
Chinese dramatists and playwrights
Chinese male novelists
Chinese male short story writers
National University of Peking alumni
Marxist theorists
Chinese Marxist writers
Ministers of Culture of the People's Republic of China
People's Republic of China essayists
People's Republic of China journalists
People from Tongxiang
Republic of China essayists
Republic of China novelists
Republic of China short story writers
Short story writers from Zhejiang
Writers from Jiaxing
Vice Chairpersons of the National Committee of the Chinese People's Political Consultative Conference
19th-century pseudonymous writers
20th-century pseudonymous writers